Cepaea is a genus of medium-sized air-breathing land snails, terrestrial pulmonate gastropod mollusks in the family Helicidae. The shells of species within this genus are often brightly colored and patterned with stripes. The two species from this genus, the common and widespread C. nemoralis and C. hortensis, have been model species for early studies of genetics and natural selection. They occur in Europe, although introduced populations occur elsewhere in the world.

Like many Helicidae, this genus of snails create and use love darts.

Species
For a long time, four species were classified in the genus Cepaea.
 However, molecular phylogenetic studies suggested that the latter two should be placed in the unrelated genera Macularia and Caucasotachea: 
 Cepaea hortensis (O. F. Müller, 1774) – white-lipped snail or garden banded snail
 Cepaea nemoralis (Linnaeus, 1758) – brown-lipped snail or grove snail
 Cepaea sylvatica (Draparnaud, 1801), now Macularia sylvatica
 Cepaea vindobonensis (Férussac, 1821), now Caucasotachea vindobonensis

References

Further reading 
 

Helicidae
Gastropod genera